A doghouse or dog house is a small shed commonly built in the shape of a little house intended for a dog.

Doghouse may also refer to:

 Doghouse (film), a 2009 British comedy horror film
 Doghouse Records, a record label
 Dog House (TV series), a 1990–91 Canadian comedy program
 "Doghouse" (song), a 1994 song by No Doubt 
 Dunay radar, which has a NATO reporting name of Dog House
 "Doghouse", a song by Neil Young from the album Bluenote Café
 Oil well dog house, control room in the offshore industry

See also
In the Doghouse (disambiguation)
The Dog House (disambiguation)